John Coleman Darnell is an American Egyptologist.

Biography
Darnell attributes his interest in archaeology to his mother, who was also had a lifelong interested in archaeology. She grew up in south Alabama and had a particular interest in the Mississippian Mound Builders. Darnell tells a story of her reading him archaeology books as a child, hoping he would take a nap, but he was fascinated and did not nap.

Darnell got his BA (1984) and MA (1985) at Johns Hopkins University and his PhD (1995) at the Oriental Institute of the University of Chicago. He joined the Yale Department of Near Eastern Languages & Civilizations as Assistant Professor in 1998; he became Associate Professor in 2004, and Professor of Egyptology in 2005.

He was the director of the Theban Desert Road Survey, which has used remote sensing to detect transportation networks between settlements in the Western Desert of Egypt that has focused on the connections between Thebes and such settlements as the Kharga Oasis.

In December 2006 a student of his created a Facebook group titled, "John C. Darnell...Man, Myth or Legend?" due to eccentricates such as wearing a monocle, and one time when "Darnell accidentally took a chunk out of a classroom chair with an ancient sword".

In January 2013, scandal broke out when it was discovered that John Darnell had engaged in a long-running affair with his student-turned-coworker Colleen Manassa. Within the small Near Eastern Languages and Civilizations (NELC) department, they were the only two faculty members in the even-smaller Egyptology program. "Four individuals with close ties to the department" claimed the relationship was common knowledge within the department, and Assyriology professor Benjamin Foster reported "the basic situation has been known for a very long time." In divorce documents filed by Darnell's wife Deborah Darnell on November 5, 2012, she asserted that the affair began in 2000 when Manassa was an undergraduate student under Darnell's supervision. On January 8, 2013, John Darnell admitted to the affair and accepted a one-year suspension without pay. Darnell also admitted to “participating in the review" of Manassa's hiring and attempting to cover up his multiple policy violations. In August the university prohibited Darnell from holding an administrative position until 2023, and Manassa until 2018.

Eventually John was invited back to teach, but Colleen left Yale in 2015.

Now married, the pair are residents of Durham, Connecticut, dress in 1920s-era vintage clothing, both in their professional life and on an every-day basis. Their book Egypt’s Golden Couple: When Akhenaten and Nefertiti Were Gods on Earth was released in November 2022.

In 2007 he had a dog Antef, named after King Antef II. In 2020 he and Colleen have two Basenji dogs, Narmer (after Narmer) and Kemi (from the root  meaning "black").

Books

References 

Living people
American Egyptologists
American archaeologists
Johns Hopkins University alumni
People from Durham, Connecticut
University of Chicago alumni
Yale University faculty
1962 births